Ibrahim Muhammad Tanko   (born 31 December 1953) is a Nigerian jurist, who served as a Justice of the Supreme Court of Nigeria from 2006 to 2022 and as Chief Justice of Nigeria from 2019 until his resignation in June 2022 citing ill-health as the reason for his decision. He was formerly a Justice of the Nigerian Courts of Appeal.

Early life
Tanko is a Fulani, born on 31 December 1953 at Doguwa - Giade, a local government area in Bauchi State, Northern Nigeria.
He attended Government Secondary School, Azare where he obtained the West Africa School Certificate in 1973 before he later proceeded to Ahmadu Bello University where he received an LL.B. degree in Islamic law in 1980.  He later obtained an LL.M. degree and a Ph.D. in law from the same university in 1985 and 1998 respectively.

Legal career
Tanko began his career in 1982, after he was called to the bar in 1981, the same year he graduated from the Nigerian Law School.
In 1989, he was appointed as Chief Magistrate of the High Court of the Federal Capital Territory, a position he held until 1991 when he became a Judge at the Bauchi State Sharia Court of Appeal. He served in that capacity for two years before he was appointed to the bench of the Nigerian courts of appeal as Justice in 1993. He held this position for thirteen years before he was appointed to the bench of the Supreme Court of Nigeria in 2006 but was sworn in on 7 January 2007.  On Thursday, 11 July 2019, Tanko was nominated by President Muhammadu Buhari as substantive CJN. This was barely 24 hours after National Judicial Council (NJC) recommended him to the president.

On Sunday, 26 June 2022, Tanko resigned as the Chief Justice of Nigeria citing ill health as the reason for his decision.

Corruption

In exclusive reports by Peoples Gazette on 19 June 2022, Tanko was accused of diverting budgetary allocation of the Judiciary and denying Justices of the Supreme Court basic working tools and training. The leaked internal memo was signed by 14 Justices of the Supreme Court, an act described by pundits as unprecedented. Tanko was also accused of ferrying family members on International trips while neglecting Justices of the Supreme Court's annual retreat.

A few days after the reports, Tanko resigned his position as the Chief Justice of Nigeria citing health issues. However, reports from news platforms in Nigeria debunk this stating that Tanko was forced out of service by the country’s secret police over the allegations of corruption and misappropriation.

Awards 
In October 2022, a Nigerian national honour of Grand Commander of the Order of the Niger (GCON) was conferred on him by President Muhammadu Buhari.

See also
 List of Justice of the Nigerian courts of appeals

References

1953 births
Nigerian jurists
People from Bauchi State
Living people
Supreme Court of Nigeria justices
Chief justices of Nigeria